M. K. Somashekar is a politician from Karnataka state. He is a leader of Indian National Congress . He was elected twice as MLA from Krishnaraja Constituency.

Political career 

He won twice as MLA from  Krishnaraja constituency in 2004 and 2013. But in 2018 elections he was defeated by S.A. Ramadas of Bharatiya Janata party.

References 

Living people
Kannada people
Politicians from Mysore
Indian National Congress politicians
Year of birth missing (living people)